Metehan Altunbaş (born 7 January 2003) is a Turkish footballer who plays as a forward for Adanaspor.

Career

Club career
Altunbaş came through the youth ranks of Eskişehirspor, making his professional debut for the club in a TFF First League match against İstanbulspor as an overtime substitute on 28 October 2018.

In September 2020, Eskişehirspor announced his transfer to Austrian first tier side LASK, effective January 2021, for a transfer fee of reportedly €150,000. He initially was designed to play for LASK's reserve team Juniors OÖ in second tier, though making his Austrian Bundesliga debut already on 14 March 2021.

International career
He played for Turkey national under-17 football team in 2020, a friendly against Slovakia, which ended with a 1–0 win for Turkey. He was also part of the U-19 team, having scored two games after nine appearances.

He was summoned to the U-23 squad for the 2021 Islamic Solidarity Games in Konya, as his team won the tournament. He played four games out of five, and scored only one, which was the goal in the final against Saudi Arabia, as Turkey gained gold with a 1–0 win. It was notable that he became the first player to score a goal against Saudi goalkeeper Nawaf Al-Aqidi after nine games without conceding a goal from an open play.

Honours
Turkey U23
Islamic Solidarity Games: 2021

References

External links
 
 
 

2003 births
Living people
Turkish footballers
Turkey youth international footballers
Association football forwards
Eskişehirspor footballers
FC Juniors OÖ players
LASK players
Adanaspor footballers
TFF First League players
2. Liga (Austria) players
Austrian Football Bundesliga players
Turkish expatriate footballers
Expatriate footballers in Austria
Turkish expatriate sportspeople in Austria